Seong-hui or Sung-hee, also spelled Song-hui in North Korea, is a Korean unisex given name. Its meaning differs based on the hanja used to write each syllable of the name. There are 27 hanja with the reading "sung" and 24 hanja with the reading "hee" on the South Korean government's official list of hanja which may be registered for use in given names.

People with this name include:

Entertainers
Jo Sung-hee (born 1978), South Korean male film director 
Bada (singer) (born Choi Sung-hee, 1980), South Korean female singer
Ja Mezz (born Kim Sung-hee, 1989), South Korean male rapper
Ko Sung-hee (born 1990), South Korean actress

Sportspeople
Kim Song-hui (speed skater) (born 1965), North Korean male speed skater
Kim Song-hui (table tennis) (born 1968), North Korean male table tennis player
Hong Seong-hui (born 1969), South Korean female rhythmic gymnast
Park Sung-hee (born 1975), South Korean female tennis player
Ri Song-hui (born 1978), North Korean female weightlifter
Kim Song-hui (footballer) (born 1987), North Korean female footballer
Han Sung-hee (born 1990), South Korean female tennis player

Others
Baek Sung-hee (born 1970), South Korean female molecular geneticist
Yoon Sung-hee (born 1973), South Korean female writer

See also
List of Korean given names
Sung-Hi Lee (born 1970), South Korean female model
Ryo Song-hui (born 1994), North Korean female ice hockey player

References

Korean unisex given names